One More Time is the thirty-third single by the Japanese Pop-rock band Porno Graffitti. It was released on September 21, 2011.

Track listing

References

2011 singles
Porno Graffitti songs
2011 songs